Stephanie Glaser (22 February 1920 – 14 January 2011) was one of Switzerland's most prominent stage, TV and film actresses, popular for her portrayal of down-to-earth, sympathetic characters.

Biography 
Stephanie Glaser was born in Neuchâtel and grew up in Bern. She studied acting at the Reinhardt-Seminar in Vienna and then performed at various theatres in Switzerland and Germany. She was a member of the Bäretatze, Floigefänger and Fédéral comedy troupes, and became, alongside Walter Roderer, one of Switzerland's noted popular actresses as well as a leading figure of the 1950s Swiss comedy scene.

She became known to the general public for her roles in the Gotthelf film adaptations Uli der Knecht and Ueli, der Pächter, and notably for starring as "Aunt Elise" in the TV show Teleboy by Kurt Felix between 1974 and 1981. Later she was also cast in the TV series Motel and Die Direktorin.

A great success was "Stan und Ollie in der Schweiz", starring Ursula Schaeppi as Stan and Glaser as Ollie in 1987.

In the 1980s she returned to film work and in 2006, at the age of 86, she was cast in her first title role in the critically and commercially successful movie Late Bloomers (Die Herbstzeitlosen). Stephanie Glaser continued working as an actress in her old age. A few months before she died on 14 January 2011, aged 90, she had been shooting scenes for the TV movie Mord hinterm Vorhang.

Selected filmography 
 1954: Uli der Knecht –  Trinette
 1955: Ueli der Pächter –  Trinette
 1955: Polizischt Wäckerli
 1957: Taxichauffeur Bänz –  Lilly
 1984: Motel (TV show)
 1988: Klassezämekunft –  Lisbeth Schneider
 1989: Leo Sonnyboy –  Mother of Leo
 1990: Der Tod zu Basel – Ms. Steiner
 1994: Die Direktorin (TV show)
 1998: Fascht e Familie (1 episode)
 2000: Komiker – Mother Beck
 2001: Spital in Angst –  Patient
 2001: Birdseye –  Maya Vogelaug
 2004: Sternenberg – Old Lady
 2005: Mein Name ist Eugen – Aunt Melanie
 2006: Late Bloomers – Martha Jost
 2007: Wen der Berg ruft
 2008: Hunkeler und der Fall Livius (TV movie)
 2009: Das Fräuleinwunder – Frida Borel
 2010: Mord hinterm Vorhang – Lydia Walliser

Awards 
 2006: Special Leopard of the Locarno International Film Festival for Late Bloomers
 2006: SwissAward in the culture category for Late Bloomers
 2006: Prix Walo

Bibliography 
 «Stephanie Glaser». In: Susanna Schwager. Das volle Leben: Frauen über achtzig erzählen. Wörterseh Verlag, Gockhausen b. Zürich, 2007, p. 45–67.

References

External links 
 
 CV (Swissfilms)
 Stephanie Glaser: ein filmischer Rückblick zum 90. Geburtstag (3 Minuten), SF, in: Glanz & Gloria of 22 February 2010
 Eine kleine Winterreise – Unterwegs mit Stephanie Glaser, SF, in: Reporter (SF) of 30 December 2009

1920 births
2011 deaths
People from Neuchâtel
Swiss film actresses
Swiss stage actresses
Swiss television actresses
Swiss expatriates in Austria
Swiss expatriates in Germany